This is a list of bridges and other crossings of the Conestoga River, from the Susquehanna River upstream to the source.  All locations are in Pennsylvania.

Crossings

See also

References

Conestoga River
Conestoga River